SPEED! Nebraska Records is a record label based in Omaha, Nebraska. They specialize in putting out 45s by local bands.

Bands
The Bombardment Society
Brimstone Howl
The Carsinogents
D is for Dragster
Domestica
Entertainment
Frontier Trust
Fullblown
The Killigans
Ideal Cleaners
Mercy Rule
The Mezcal Bros.
The Monroes
Pioneer Disaster
The Sons Of
Techlepathy

See also
 List of record labels

External links
SPEED! Nebraska Records official website

Companies based in Omaha, Nebraska
American independent record labels
Indie rock record labels